Metanarsia monochroma is a moth of the family Gelechiidae. It is found in Afghanistan and Pakistan.

The wingspan is 15-18.5 mm. Adults are on wing in May.

References

Moths described in 2008
Metanarsia